Qomshaneh (also Romanized as Qomshāneh; also known as Ghomeshaneh Pishkhar, Gomīshāneh, Kūmshan, Qamīshan, Qomīshāneh, and Qomūshān) is a village in Pish Khowr Rural District, Pish Khowr District, Famenin County, Hamadan Province, Iran. At the 2006 census, its population was 276, in 51 families.

References 

Populated places in Famenin County